Playhouse Theatre or Playhouse Theater may refer to:

United Kingdom
 Playhouse Theatre, a West End theatre in London
 Playhouse Theatre, Manchester
 Playhouse Theatre, Harlow, in Harlow
 Derby Playhouse
 Edinburgh Playhouse
 Epsom Playhouse
 Erith Playhouse
 Liverpool Playhouse
 Nottingham Playhouse
 Norwich Playhouse
 The Oxford Playhouse
 Perth Playhouse
 Sheffield Playhouse

United States
 Playhouse Theater, in Bennettsville Historic District, in Bennettsville, South Carolina
 Playhouse Theatre (Seattle), in Seattle, Washington
 Playhouse Theatre (New York City), in New York City

Other places
 Vancouver Playhouse Theatre Company, at the Queen Elizabeth Theatre, Vancouver, Canada
 The Playhouse Theatre (Perth), a theatre in Perth, Western Australia, demolished in 2012

See also
 Playhouse (disambiguation)